My Name Is Anthony Gonsalves may refer to:

 "My Name Is Anthony Gonsalves" (song), Bollywood song featured in the 1977 film Amar Akbar Anthony
 My Name Is Anthony Gonsalves (film), a 2008 film based on the song